The 2007–08 season was Galatasaray's 104th in existence and the 50th consecutive season in the Süper Lig. This article shows statistics of the club's players in the season, and also lists all matches that the club have played in the season.

Squad statistics

Players in / out

Süper Lig

Standings

Türkiye Kupası

Group stage

Quarter-final

Semi-final

UEFA Cup

Second qualifying round

First round

Group stage

Round of 32

Attendance

References

Galatasaray S.K. (football) seasons
Galatasaray S.K.
Turkish football championship-winning seasons
2000s in Istanbul
Galatasaray Sports Club 2007–08 season